The 1900 Chicago Maroons football team was an American football team that represented the University of Chicago during the 1900 Western Conference football season.  In their ninth season under head coach Amos Alonzo Stagg, the Maroons compiled a 9–5–1 record, finished in sixth place in the Western Conference with a 2–3–1 record against conference opponents, and outscored all opponents by a combined total of 204 to 135.

Schedule

Roster

Head coach: Amos Alonzo Stagg (9th year at Chicago)

References

Chicago
Chicago Maroons football seasons
Chicago Maroons football